Ioannis Demertzis May refer to:

Ioannis Demertzis (basketball) (born 1983), Greek basketball player
Ioannis Demertzis (Macedonian fighter), Greek Macedonian chieftain